Knapp House is a historic home located at Newark Valley in Tioga County, New York. It is a two-story, frame Colonial Revival style residence with a hipped roof built about 1905.  Also on the property is a two-story, gambrel roofed carriage house and a chicken coop.

It was listed on the National Register of Historic Places in 1998.

References

Houses on the National Register of Historic Places in New York (state)
Colonial Revival architecture in New York (state)
Houses completed in 1905
Houses in Tioga County, New York
National Register of Historic Places in Tioga County, New York
1905 establishments in New York (state)